Sir Leonard Lyell, 1st Baron Lyell, Bt  (21 October 1850 – 18 September 1926), was a Scottish Liberal politician.

The eldest son of Colonel Henry Lyell and Katharine Murray Lyell, he was a nephew of Sir Charles Lyell, 1st Baronet, the geologist.

He served as Liberal Member of Parliament for Orkney and Shetland from 1885 to 1900, and was commissioned a Deputy Lieutenant for Forfarshire in December 1901.

He was created a baronet in 1894 and raised to the peerage as Baron Lyell of Kinnordy in the County of Forfar, on 8 July 1914.

He married Mary Stirling in 1874, and had one son, Charles Henry (1875-1918) and two daughters, Mary Leonora (Nora), born 1877, and Helen (Nelly), born 1878.

His only son Charles Henry Lyell was also a Liberal MP but as he died in 1918 his son Charles Anthony Lyell succeeded to both the baronetcy and barony.

References

External links 
 

1850 births
1926 deaths
Barons in the Peerage of the United Kingdom
Deputy Lieutenants of Forfarshire
Scottish Liberal Party MPs
Members of the Parliament of the United Kingdom for Orkney and Shetland
UK MPs 1895–1900
UK MPs who were granted peerages
Place of birth missing
Barons created by George V